Judge George Washington Olvany (June 20, 1876 – October 15, 1952) was a New York General Sessions Court judge, the deputy New York City Fire Commissioner, and the leader of Tammany Hall. 


Biography
He was born on June 20, 1876. He replaced Charles Francis Murphy in 1924 as the leader of Tammany Hall. Olvany was the first Tammany Hall boss to have received a college education. A popular story used to describe Olvany was as follows: A Board of Alderman meeting in the early 1900s was interrupted by a youngster who yelled, "Alderman, your saloon is on fire!" All the other Alderman left the room. While acting as the Boss, Olvany used his law firm Olvany, Eisner and Donnelly, to direct other law firms to bring clients before the city's Board of Standards and Appeals. Olvany firm garnered up to $5 million from fees at the point when the Seabury Commission began investigating at the behest of Franklin D. Roosevelt. He resigned from Tammany Hall in 1929. He died on October 15, 1952.

References

Further reading

External links

Political corruption in the United States
Leaders of Tammany Hall
1876 births
1952 deaths
American political bosses from New York (state)
Commissioners of the New York City Fire Department